Lucille Chaffin Kent (1908–1997) was an American aviator and instructor known for training military pilots during World War II.

Early life and education
Lucille Chaffin was born in Campbell County, Virginia on 28 April 1908 to Lula and Walter Beverley Chaffin Snr, who worked in life insurance. She attended Randolph-Macon Woman's College in Lynchburg, Virginia, graduating in 1938.

Career 
She was one of the first women in Virginia to earn an instructor's rating in aeronautics. She worked at the Civilian Pilot Training Program in Lynchburg where she served as director of the ground school. She taught for Lynchburg College at various locations during the World War II era, instructing about 2,000 future pilots who would go on the serve in the military.

Personal life 
Chaffin married Robert Bruce Caldwell on December 24, 1924, later divorcing him in September 1946. She then married William C Kent in 1948.

She died on June 3, 1997.

Commemoration 
In 2016 the Virginia Department of Historic Resources dedicated an historical marker in her honor in Lynchburg.  In 2018 the Virginia Capitol Foundation announced that Lovenstein's name would be on the Virginia Women's Monument's glass Wall of Honor.

References

1908 births
1997 deaths
American aviators
People from Virginia
American women aviators
Aviators from Virginia